Miss America 1984, the 57th Miss America pageant, was held at the Boardwalk Hall in Atlantic City, New Jersey on September 17, 1983 on NBC Network. Debra Maffett (Miss California 1982) crowned her successor, Miss New York 1983, Vanessa Williams at the end of the nationally televised event.  In July 1984, Williams was forced to resign over the unauthorized publication of nude photographs and was succeeded by first runner-up, Miss New Jersey Suzette Charles, who served as Miss America until September 20, 1984. Among the contestants who did not place among the ten finalists, Miss New Mexico 1983 Mai Shanley, eventually went on to win the Miss USA 1984 title.

Overview

During the preliminaries for the Miss America 1984 pageant, Vanessa Williams won "Preliminary Swimsuit" and "Preliminary Talent" (with a vocal performance of "Happy Days Are Here Again"). She was also crowned Miss America 1984 on September 17, 1983 (becoming the first African American woman to win the title). Williams later commented that she was one of five minority contestants that year, noting that ballet dancer Deneen Graham "had already had a cross burned on her front yard because she was the first black Miss North Carolina [1983]." She also pointed out that "Suzette Charles was the first runner-up, and she was biracial. But when the press started, when I would go out on the - on the tour and do my appearances, and people would come up and say they never thought they'd see the day that it would happen; when people would want to shake my hand, and you'd see tears in their eyes, and they'd say, I never thought I'd see it in my lifetime - that's when, you know, it was definitely a very special honor." Williams' reign as Miss America was not without its challenges and controversies, however. For the first time in pageant history, a reigning Miss America was the target of death threats and hate mail. In addition, ten months into her reign as Miss America, Williams received an anonymous phone call stating nude photos of her (taken before her pageant days) would be published in Penthouse. The publication of these photos ultimately led to her resignation as Miss America.

Williams believed the photographs were private and had been destroyed; she claims she never signed a release permitting the photos to be used. The black-and-white photos dated back to 1982 (the year before she won the Miss America Pageant), when she worked as an assistant and makeup artist for Mount Kisco, New York photographer Tom Chiapel. According to Williams, Chiapel said that "he had a concept of having two models pose nude for silhouettes. Basically to make different shapes and forms. The light would be behind the models. I was reluctant, but since he assured me that I would be the only one to see them and I would not be identifiable in the photographs, I agreed. He had also gotten another model to agree to this." Hugh Hefner, the publisher of Playboy, was initially offered the photos, but turned them down, stating: "The single victim in all of this was the young woman herself, whose right to make this decision was taken away from her. If she wanted to make this kind of statement, that would be her business, but the statement wasn't made by her." Penthouse published the photos without her permission in 1984, however, in what the PBS documentary Miss America described as "the most successful issue of Penthouse magazine ever printed, netting publisher Bob Guccione a windfall profit of $14 million."

According to Essence magazine, Williams "was forced to resign from her title as she faced public shaming and bullying from the public at large."  Williams herself later described these events as "the betrayal, and the humiliation, that happened to me on a grand scale." She also noted that her parents experienced "an incredible amount of shame and humiliation" and were equally the subject of harassment at the time. After being given 72 hours to make a decision, Williams formally announced her decision to resign in  a press conference on July 23, 1984  and the title subsequently went to the first runner-up, Miss New Jersey Suzette Charles (who served out the final seven weeks of Williams' reign).  On September 7, 1984, Williams filed a $500 million lawsuit against Chiapel and Guccione. She eventually dropped the suit a year later, explaining that she wanted to put the scandal behind her and move on.

Williams returned to the Miss America stage on September 13, 2015 for the Miss America 2016 pageant, when she served as head judge and performed "Oh How the Years Go By."  The pageant began with former Miss America CEO Sam Haskell issuing an apology to Williams, telling her that although "none of us currently in the organization were involved then, on behalf of today's organization, I want to apologize to you and to your mother, Miss Helen Williams. I want to apologize for anything that was said or done that made you feel any less the Miss America you are and the Miss America you always will be." Suzette Charles (Williams' replacement)  said in an interview with Inside Edition that she was perplexed over the apology and suggested that it was given for the purpose of ratings. Williams also commented on the events surrounding her return, stating in an interview with Robin Roberts that "there's a lot of people who feel I should return, so the people who harbor the resentment I understand it but realize that all of those people that were part of the old guard are no longer there."

Results

Order of announcements

Top 10

Preliminary awards

Non-finalist awards

Judges
 Rod McKuen
 Jerry Vale
 Marian McKnight
 Christopher Little
 Marguerite Piazza
 Tandy Rice
 Jeanne Meixell
 Lois Ernst

Contestants

See also
Vanessa Williams and Miss America

References

External links
 Miss America official website

1984
1984 controversies
1984 beauty pageants
1983 in New Jersey
Vanessa Williams
September 1983 events in the United States
Events in Atlantic City, New Jersey